Sundance and the Kid is  a 1969 Spaghetti Western comedy directed by Duccio Tessari and starring Giuliano Gemma, Nino Benvenuti, and 
Sydne Rome.  The film was also released under the titles Alive or Preferably Dead and Sundance Cassidy and Butch the Kid.

Plot
Two estranged brothers, city gambler Monty (Gemma) and Wild West farmer Ted Mulligan (Benvenuti) inherit $300,000 from their late uncle, on condition that they endure to live together for six months. The two start fighting about everything, and trouble begins as soon as Monty arrives in Ted's hometown.

Cast
 Giuliano Gemma as Monty Mulligan 
 Nino Benvenuti as Ted Mulligan 
 Sydne Rome as Rossella Scott 
 Julio Peña as Dottore 
 Antonio Casas as Barnds 
 Cris Huerta as Jim 
 George Rigaud as Mr. Scott 
 Dan van Husen as Ranger 
 Víctor Israel as Mayoral Candidate's Henchman

Release
Sundance and the Kid was first distributed in 1969.

Reception
Bert Fridlund described Sundance and the Kid as being a forerunner to the Trinity films series starring Terence Hill and Bud Spencer which reshaped the Spaghetti Western.

References

Sources

External links
 
 

1969 films
1969 Western (genre) films
1960s buddy films
Spanish Western (genre) films
Spaghetti Western films
Italian buddy films
Films directed by Duccio Tessari
Films about brothers
Films shot in Almería
Films scored by Gianni Ferrio
1960s Italian films